A helper application is an external viewer program launched to display content retrieved using a web browser. Some examples include JPEGview, Windows Media Player, QuickTime Player, Real Player and Adobe Reader. Unlike a plugin whose full code is included into the browser's address space, a helper application is a standard application, typically an image viewer or similar type lacking full save functionality.

The use of helper applications was more common in the early days of the World Wide Web, when HTML and file formats were still becoming standardized and computers were less powerful. Users of a slower computer could configure their browser to hand off all images using a helper application, which would cause the browser to display a standard icon as a placeholder. The user could click the icon only for images they wished to view, thus saving time and bandwidth. In addition, it was considered important for early browsers to be able to keep an image illustrating a figure or graph on screen while scrolling through a long scientific paper and having the image displayed in an external window while the browser window was scrolled allowed that.

See also
 Plug-in (computing)
 Video player (software)

References

Web browsers